Songs from the Southern Seas or Song from the Southern Seas is a 2008 Kazakh, German, French and Russian film directed by Marat Sarulu and produced by Sain Gabdullin, Karsten Stoter, Benny Dreschsel, Yuri Obukhov, Guillaume de Seille with English subtitles. The film was made under the following banners— Kino Company, Rohfilm, Kinoproba, Arizona Films.

Plot 
The film revolves around the lives of two couples: Ivan and his wife Mariia who are Russians; and Asaan and his wife who are Kazakh. Both families are living in camaraderie in a village in Great Steppe in Kazakhstan till a twist occurs in their lives.  Maria gets pregnant and gives birth to a baby boy with dark complexion. Seeing the new-born's skin color, Ivan becomes suspicious and feels Maria has an affair with Asaan, who has similar complexion. This causes a rift between the two families that lasts 15 years and then takes a fateful turn. The young son of Ivan left his school studies and starts wandering around on his horse, gets into trouble with horse riders of Kyrgyz for stealing their cattle. His brother-in-law, a Cossack, also thrashes him for his lack of knowledge of his genealogy. Ivan, feeling rootless, meets his grandfather, who tells him about his family's multinational background. During this time Asaan is also in search of his distinct personality and sitting on the steppe, broods about a “woman of the southern seas” who could give him peace of mind. After some time, Asaan's wife also becomes pregnant and gives birth to a child with ginger-color complexion, which is similar to Ivan's complexion. The film is set around the Lake Issyk-kul in Kyrgyzstan.

Cast 
 Irina Angejkina as Maria
 Vladimir Yavorsky as Ivan
 Dzhaidarbek Kunguzhinov as Asan 
 Ajzhan Ajtenova as Aisha

Production
The film is directed by Marat Sarulu, who is also the story writer. The producers are Sain Gabdullin, Karsten Stöter, Benny Dreschsel, Yuri Obukhov, and Guillaume De Seille. 
Cinematography is credited to Seille. The film is edited by Giorgi Beridze and sound recording is by Karl Riedl. The production crew consisting of Kazakh, Russian, German, French conveys a message of international cooperation in film production. The music is folk based. The film's running time is 80 minutes. The worldwide premiere of the film was on 14 October 2009.

References

External links 
 

2008 films
Kazakh-language films
2000s German-language films
2000s Russian-language films
2000s French-language films